Cedestis exiguata is a moth of the family Yponomeutidae. It is found in Japan.

The wingspan is about 11 mm.

References

Yponomeutidae
Moths of Japan
Moths described in 1977